Vice Admiral Michael Keith Utley,  is a senior Royal Navy officer.

Naval career
Educated at Cowbridge School, Utley joined the Royal Navy in 1990. He became the commanding officer of the patrol ship  in 1995, of the patrol ship  in 2003, and of the patrol ship  in 2004, before becoming commanding officer of the frigate  in 2006. He went on to become Commander Sea Training in 2010, before being appointed the last commanding officer of the aircraft carrier  in May 2013 and in that role was deployed to provide humanitarian aid in the wake of Typhoon Haiyan in the Philippines in November 2013.

Utley became commander of Standing NATO Maritime Group 2 in June 2017, Commander United Kingdom Carrier Strike Group in October 2018, and Commander United Kingdom Strike Force in December 2019. He assumed command of NATO's Allied Maritime Command in January 2023. 

Utley was appointed Officer of the Order of the British Empire (OBE) for his service in the wake of Typhoon Haiyan in the Philippines in the 2015 Special Honours, and Companion of the Order of the Bath (CB) in the 2020 Birthday Honours.

References

Companions of the Order of the Bath
Living people
Officers of the Order of the British Empire
Royal Navy rear admirals
1970 births